Hermine Bosetti née von Flick (28 September 1875, Vienna – 1 May 1936, Hohenrain or Munich), was a German coloratura soprano.

Bosetti sang her debut in Wiesbaden (1898) as "Ännchen" in Der Freischütz. In 1900, she was a member of the Vienna State Opera and from 1901 until 1924 she was a star singer with the Bavarian State Opera. In 1903, she sang the role of "Colombina" in the first performance of Le donne curiose (Ermanno Wolf-Ferrari). She appeared in most of the German opera houses as well as in the Netherlands, Belgium, London, and Russia. In 1908, she sang in Vienna as a guest in roles such as "The Queen of the Night" and "Marguerite de Valois". She recorded for G&T Recordings, Odeon, and Gramophone.

She taught at the Hoch Conservatory in Frankfurt am Main from 1926 to 1928. Among her students were Marcia Van Dresser and Adele Kern.

In 1913, she became the face of Aok products in Germany in their advertising, claiming "I have used Aok soap for years".

Recordings
 The Record of Singing (Part 2) Auber: 'Fra Diavolo' – Welches Glück ich arme (Munich, 1906)
 Aus Münchens Operngeschichte (Sängerinnen und Sänger der Münchner Hof- und Staatsoper von 1900–1945) (Die Entführung aus dem Serail: Martern aller Arten)
 Sie sangen im Prinzregententheater (Die Entführung aus dem Serail: Ach ich liebte)

Sources 
 Cahn, Peter: Das Hoch'sche Konservatorium in Frankfurt am Main (1878–1978), Frankfurt am Main: Kramer, 1979.
 Kesting, Jürgen: Die großen Sänger. Düsseldorf: Claassen, 1986.
 Karl Josef Kutsch/ Leo Riemens: Unvergängliche Stimmen: Sängerlexikon. Bern und München: Francke, 1975.

External links
 Aok Kosmetik Timeline (see 1913)

1875 births
1936 deaths
German operatic sopranos
Musicians from Vienna
19th-century German women opera singers
20th-century German women opera singers
Academic staff of Hoch Conservatory